William Morgan, FRS (26 May OS? 1750 – 4 May 1833) was a Welsh physician, physicist and statistician, who is considered the father of modern actuarial science. He is also credited with being the first to record the "invisible light" produced when a current is passed through a partly evacuated glass tube: "the first x-ray tube".

Life
He was born in Bridgend, Glamorgan, son to physician William Morgan and Sarah (sister of Richard Price). William's brother was George Cadogan Morgan. At eighteen he received medical training at Guy's Hospital, London, working also as an apothecary to pay his way. He did not complete his training, but after one year returned to Bridgend to join his father's practice. He was not popular with his father's patients: they thought him inexperienced and they resented receiving treatment from someone with a deformity—Morgan suffered from a club foot. After his father's death he left medicine and in 1774, on the recommendation of his mother's brother, the renowned Richard Price, he was appointed Assistant Actuary of the Equitable Life Assurance Society. In February 1775, after the death of John Pocock, he was elected Actuary. By the time he retired on 2 December 1830, 56 years later at the age of 80, he had laid the foundations of the actuarial profession —in fact the term "actuarial" became attached to the profession because of his title.

He won the Copley Medal in 1789, for his two papers on the values of Reversions and Survivorships, printed in the last two volumes of the Philosophical Transactions of the Royal Society, in the field of actuarial science:
 "On the Probabilities of Survivorships Between Two Persons of Any Given Ages, and the Method of Determining the Values of Reversions Depending on those Survivorships", 1788–1794
 "On the Method of Determining, from the Real Probabilities of Life, the Value of a Contingent Reversion in Which Three Lives are Involved in the Survivorship". Philosophical Transactions of the Royal Society of London, vol. 79 (1789) pp. 40–54

He was elected a Fellow of the Society, in May of the following year.

Advised by Joseph Priestley, a family friend, he developed an interest in scientific experimentation and is credited with being the first to record the "invisible light" produced when a current is passed through a partly evacuated glass tube: "the first x-ray tube".

Later in life, through his uncle, Richard Price, he became friends with noted radicals, including Tom Paine and Francis Burdett.
He escaped with only a warning when in 1794, the authorities rounded up members of the movement and charged them with treason.

He died at Stamford Hill on 4 May 1833, and was buried at Hornsey.

Other publications:
 The Doctrine of Annuities and Assurances on Lives and Survivorships, 1779
  (Discusses the work of Adair Crawford)
  – translation into Italian
 Computation of Premiums for Life Assurance on the Basis of the Northampton Table of Mortality, manuscript
 Valuation (Individually) of the Assurance Contracts in Force in 1786, manuscript
 Yearly Computation of Expected Deaths and Accounts Showing the State of the Equitable Life Assurance Society According to the Plan Suggested by Richard Price, manuscript
 Nine Addresses to the General Court of the Equitable Society Covering the Years 1793 to 1830, 1833

References

Attribution

External links
 Royal Society citation
 Some family connexions
 Catalogue of an exhibition illustrating the history of actuarial science in the United Kingdom, 1973
 

1750 births
1833 deaths
18th-century Welsh people
19th-century Welsh people
People from Bridgend
British actuaries
British  physicists
British statisticians
Fellows of the Royal Society
Recipients of the Copley Medal
19th-century British scientists